Rud-e Posht or Rud Posht or Rudposht may refer to:
 Rud Posht, Bandar-e Anzali, Gilan Province
 Bala Rudposht, Lahijan County, Gilan Province
 Rud Posht, Rasht, Gilan Province
 Rudposht, Mahmudabad, Mazandaran Province
 Rud Posht, Sari, Mazandaran Province
 Rud-e Posht, Tonekabon, Mazandaran Province

See also
 Posht Rud (disambiguation)